Xenocytaea vonavonensis is a jumping spider species in the genus Xenocytaea. The male was first identified in 2011 by Barbara Maria Patoleta. The female has not been described.

Description

Distribution
Xenocytaea vonavonensis is found on Vonavona in the Solomon Islands, after which the species is named.

References

Fauna of the Solomon Islands
Salticidae
Spiders described in 2011
Spiders of Oceania